Salomo Ntuve (born 20 November 1988, in Kondoa, Dodoma, Tanzania) is a Swedish boxer. At the 2012 Summer Olympics, he competed in the Men's flyweight, but was defeated in the first round.

References

Living people
Olympic boxers of Sweden
Boxers at the 2012 Summer Olympics
Flyweight boxers
Swedish male boxers

Naturalized citizens of Sweden
Swedish people of Tanzanian descent
People from Kondoa District
1988 births
21st-century Swedish people